Elsie Ruth Anderson (23 June 1907, Newport, Rhode Island – 24 November 1989, Boston, Massachusetts) was an American musicologist, weather observer, and editor.

Biography 
Anderson attended the New England Conservatory of Music from 1924 to 1931, again in 1934, and again from 1940 to 1941. On June 23, 1931, Anderson received a Diploma in Orchestra with a concentration in Violin from the New England Conservatory of Music.
 
During World War II, Anderson enlisted in the WAVES and trained at the Navy Aerographers School at Lakehurst Maxfield Field, New Jersey. She was assigned first to a Naval Air Station in Indiana and then to the Naval Intelligence Unit in Washington, D.C.  After World War II, Anderson continued with that unit, including one year in the United Kingdom.  In 1954, Anderson began working for the American Meteorological Society in Boston.  For 15 years, she served as News Editor of the Bulletin of the American Meteorological Society.  She also wrote a history of the building that houses the AMS – the Harrison Gray Otis House at 45 Beacon Street.  While working for the AMS, she compiled and wrote the Contemporary American Composers: A Biographical Dictionary, published in 1977, with a follow-up edition in 1982.

Published works 
 Contemporary American Composers: A Biographical Dictionary, G K Hall & Co. (G.K. Hall was acquired by ITT in September 1969 and sold to Macmillan Publishing in 1985; it is now an imprint of Thomson Gale)
 1st ed. (1976) (513 pages, 4to); 
 2nd ed. (1982);

References

1907 births
1989 deaths
American book editors
New England Conservatory alumni
20th-century American women scientists
20th-century American scientists
United States Navy sailors
WAVES personnel
American musicians